Opsiplanon luellus is a species of achilid planthopper in the family Achilidae. The species is also referred to as Opsiplanon luella.

References

Further reading

External links

 

Insects described in 1923
Achilidae